Hilda Rollett (1873–1970) was a New Zealand teacher, journalist and writer. She was born in Auckland, New Zealand in 1873.

References

1873 births
1970 deaths
People from Auckland
New Zealand women journalists
20th-century New Zealand women writers
20th-century New Zealand journalists
20th-century New Zealand writers